Anders Kristiansen (born 17 March 1990) is a Norwegian professional footballer who plays as a goalkeeper for Sarpsborg 08.

Career statistics

Club

References

Living people
1990 births
Sportspeople from Stavanger
Norwegian footballers
Association football goalkeepers
Norwegian First Division players
Eliteserien players
Bryne FK players
Sarpsborg 08 FF players
Royale Union Saint-Gilloise players
Challenger Pro League players
Norwegian expatriate footballers
Norwegian expatriate sportspeople in Belgium
Expatriate footballers in Belgium